This article lists events from the year 2020 in South Sudan

Incumbents 

 President: Salva Kiir Mayardit
 Vice President: Riek Machar

Events 

Ongoing – South Sudanese Civil War, Sudanese nomadic conflicts, ethnic violence in South Sudan

8 January – The United States announces sanctions against First Vice President Taban Deng Gai of South Sudan for human rights violations.
 10 February – There still is no agreement in South Sudan over the number and boundaries of its states. A week later talks are still stalled.
 13 February – The government of South Sudan is accused of ignoring four reports linking oil pollution and birth defects in Upper Nile and Unity states.
19 February – Locust swarms spread from Uganda to South Sudan.
20 February – The government and rebels reach a peace agreement in South Sudan.
5 April - The first case of COVID-19 in the country was confirmed in a 29-year-old patient, a United Nations worker, who arrived on 28 February from the Netherlands.
14 May 14 – The first death from COVID-19 occurs in the country.
16 May – Sudan People's Liberation Army Day, South Sudan
18 May – First Vice President Riek Machar announced he and his wife, Angelina Teny, had tested positive for the virus.
19 May – Information Minister Michael Makuei Lueth and all members of the nation's 15-member coronavirus task force tested positive for COVID-19.
4 August – Olympic track and field athlete Yiech Pur Biel was named a United Nations Goodwill Ambassador for the United Nations High Commissioner for Refugees (UNHCR).
9 August - Violence erupted when South Sudan People's Defence Forces members attempted to disarm civilians at a market in Tonj East, leading to at least seventy people being killed.
10 August - Armed civilians attacked a South Sudan People's Defence Forces base in the town of Romich, where they also looted a market.
September – Two soldiers are convicted of rape and 24 on other charges for crimes committed in Yei, Central Equatoria in May of this year.
11 December – International food security experts from the Famine Review Committeesaid in December 2020 that Pibor County was likely in a famine. Flooding and violence have prevented access to aid.
31 December – One million people have been displaced by floods since June. Food shortages, malaria, and diarrheal diseases spread.

Deaths 

 January 4 – Oliver Batali Albino, 84, South Sudanese politician
 June 2 – John Luk Jok, 68, South Sudanese politician, Minister of Justice (2011–2013).

See also

COVID-19 pandemic in South Sudan
COVID-19 pandemic in Africa
2020 in East Africa
2020 in Sudan
2020 in Ethiopia
2020 in Kenya
2020 in Middle Africa

References 

 
2020s in South Sudan
Years of the 21st century in South Sudan
South Sudan
South Sudan